Conseil d'État may refer to:

Conseil d'État (Belgique), an organ of the Belgian government
Conseil d'État (France), a body of the French national government
Conseil d'État (Switzerland), government of some of the cantons of Switzerland
Conseil d'État (Luxembourg), an institution in Luxembourg that advises the national legislature